This is a list of films which have reached number one at the weekend box office in the United Kingdom during 2013.

Films

Notes

References

2013
United Kingdom
2013 in British cinema